Mr Quickie (foaled 10 August 2015) is a retired multiple Group 1 winning Australian bred thoroughbred racehorse.

Background

Mr Quickie was a A$115,000 Magic Millions purchase for Dalziel Racing from the Rosemont Stud draft.  Rosemont Stud remained in the ownership and also stand his sire Shamus Award.

Racing career

Un-raced as a two-year-old, Mr Quickie made his debut on the 25 September 2018 at Murtoa Racecourse, where he finished in second placing.

Mr Quickie then proceeded to win 9 of his next 12 starts, which culminated on 8 June 2019 with his first Group One victory at Eagle Farm in the Queensland Derby. He was backed in from $5.50 to start a $2.80 favourite. He defeated Vow And Declare by just under a length who would later go on that year to win the Melbourne Cup.  Mr Quickie had to survive a protest from jockey Damien Oliver on board Vow And Declare, however this was dismissed by stewards.

Mr Quickie's next victory was his second Group One on 10 October 2020 in the Toorak Handicap at Caulfield.  Ridden by Jamie Kah, Mr Quickie was a two-length winner at odds of 20/1.

Mr Quickie was retired from racing after suffering a hip injury in 2021.

Pedigree

References 

Australian racehorses
Racehorses bred in Australia
Racehorses trained in Australia
2015 racehorse births